Colombia at the 1936 Summer Olympics in Berlin, Germany was the nation's second appearance at the tenth edition of the Summer Olympic Games.

See also

Sports in Colombia

References
Official Olympic Reports

Nations at the 1936 Summer Olympics
1936 Summer Olympics